Orthotylus caprai is a species of bug from the Miridae family that can be found in European countries such as Croatia, Germany, Great Britain, Switzerland and the island of Sardinia.

References

Insects described in 1955
Hemiptera of Europe
caprai